Antonio Lucibello (born 25 February 1942) is an Italian prelate of the Catholic Church who worked in the diplomatic service of the Holy See from 1971 to 2016. He has held the rank of archbishop and apostolic nuncio since 1995.

Biography
Antonio Lucibello was born on 25 February 1942 in Spezzano Albanese, Calabria, Italy. He was ordained a priest on 23 July 1967. He studied at the Pontifical Ecclesiastical Academy.

He entered the diplomatic service of the Holy See in 1971. He filled positions in the Apostolic Nunciatures in Panama, Ethiopia, Haiti, Argentina, the Democratic Republic of the Congo, Zaire, Yugoslavia, Greece and Ireland. On 8 September 1995, Pope John Paul II appointed him titular archbishop of Thurio and Apostolic Nuncio to Gambia, Guinea and Liberia, as well as Apostolic Delegate to Sierra Leone.

He received his episcopal consecration from Cardinal Secretary of State Angelo Sodano on 4 November 1995.

On 27 July 1999, John Paul named him Apostolic Nuncio to Paraguay.

Pope Benedict XVI appointed him Apostolic Nuncio to Türkiye and Turkmenistan on 27 August 2005. During his service in these posts, a Catholic priest was murdered in Ankara in February 2006, Pope Benedict visited Türkiye in December 2006, Bishop Luigi Padovese of the Apostolic Vicariate of Anatolia was murdered in 2010, and in 2015 Türkiye recalled its ambassador to the Holy See after Pope Francis used the word "genocide" to describe the deaths of Armenians in Ottoman Türkiye.

With the appointment of his successor Paul Fitzpatrick Russell on 19 March 2016, Lucibello ended his active service as nuncio.

See also
 List of heads of the diplomatic missions of the Holy See

Notes

References

Additional sources
  Brief review of his principal assignments with quotes.

Living people
Apostolic Nuncios to the Gambia
Apostolic Nuncios to Guinea
Apostolic Nuncios to Liberia
Apostolic Nuncios to Sierra Leone
Apostolic Nuncios to Paraguay
Apostolic Nuncios to Turkey
Apostolic Nuncios to Turkmenistan
People from the Province of Cosenza
1942 births